Edward Adolphus St. Maur, 12th Duke of Somerset,  (20 December 180428 November 1885), styled Lord Seymour until 1855, was a British Whig aristocrat and politician, who served in various cabinet positions in the mid-19th century, including that of First Lord of the Admiralty.

Background and education
Somerset was the eldest son of Edward St. Maur, 11th Duke of Somerset, and Lady Charlotte, daughter of Archibald Hamilton, 9th Duke of Hamilton. He was baptized on 16 February 1805 at St. George's, Hanover Square, London. He was educated at Eton and Christ Church, Oxford.

Political career
Somerset sat as Member of Parliament as Lord Seymour for Okehampton between 1830 and 1831 and for Totnes between 1834 and 1855. He served under Lord Melbourne as a Lord of the Treasury between 1835 and 1839, as Joint Secretary to the Board of Control between 1839 and 1841 and as Under-Secretary of State for the Home Department between June and August 1841 and was a member of Lord John Russell's first administration as First Commissioner of Woods and Forests between 1849 and 1851, when the office was abolished. He served on the Royal Commission on the British Museum (1847–49). In August 1851 he was appointed to the newly created office of First Commissioner of Works by Russell. In October of the same year, he entered the cabinet and was sworn of the Privy Council. He remained First Commissioner of Works until the government fell in February 1852.

Somerset succeeded his father in the dukedom in 1855 and entered the House of Lords. He did not serve in Lord Palmerston's first administration, but when Palmerston became Prime Minister for the second time in 1859, Somerset was appointed First Lord of the Admiralty, with a seat in the cabinet. He held this post until 1866, the last year under the premiership of Russell. He refused to join William Ewart Gladstone's first ministry in 1868, but gave independent support to the chief measures of the government.

He was made a Knight of the Garter in 1862 and in 1863 he was created Earl St. Maur, of Berry Pomeroy in the County of Devon. "St. Maur" was supposed to have been the original form of the family name and "Seymour" a later corruption. From some time in the early 19th century until 1923, "St. Maur" was used as the family name, but since 1923 the dukes have again used the familiar "Seymour".

Somerset was also the author of Christian Theology and Modern Scepticism (1872), and Monarchy and Democracy (1880). Between 1861 and 1885 he served as Lord Lieutenant of Devon.

Family
Somerset married in Grosvenor Square, London, on 10 June 1830, Jane Georgiana Sheridan, who was the "Queen of Beauty" at the Eglinton Tournament of 1839. The Somersets had two sons and three daughters:
Lady Jane Hermione Seymour (1 January 18324 April 1909) she married Sir Frederick Ulric Graham, of Netherby, 3d Baronet on 26 October 1852. They had eight children including the Countess of Verulam and the Duchess of Montrose
Lady Ulrica Frederica Jane Seymour (12 January 183326 or 28 January 1916) she married Rt. Hon. Lord Henry Frederick Thynne on 1 June 1858. They had six children.
Edward Adolphus Ferdinand Seymour, Earl St. Maur (17 July 183530 September 1869) he had two illegitimate children with Rosina Swan.
Lord Edward Percy Seymour (19 August 184120 December 1865) was a diplomat and died after being mauled by a bear
Lady Helen Guendolen Seymour (184614 August 1910) she married Sir John William Ramsden, 5th Baronet on 2 August 1865. They had four children. Lady Guendolen inherited the Bulstrode estate.

The Duchess of Somerset died in December 1884. Somerset survived her by less than a year and died in November 1885, aged 80, and was buried with her in St James's Churchyard in Gerrards Cross, Buckinghamshire. As his two sons had both died in his lifetime, the family titles (except the Earldom of St. Maur, which became extinct) devolved on his younger brother, Archibald Seymour, 13th Duke of Somerset.

The 12th Duke left his London residence, Somerset House in Park Lane, to his eldest daughter Lady Hermione Graham.

Ancestry

References

External links
 

1805 births
1885 deaths
512
Knights of the Garter
First Lords of the Admiralty
Members of the Parliament of the United Kingdom for Totnes
UK MPs 1830–1831
UK MPs 1832–1835
UK MPs 1835–1837
UK MPs 1837–1841
UK MPs 1841–1847
UK MPs 1847–1852
UK MPs 1852–1857
UK MPs who inherited peerages
UK MPs who were granted peerages
Lord-Lieutenants of Devon
Edward Seymour, 12th Duke of Somerset
Whig (British political party) MPs for English constituencies
People associated with the British Museum
Members of the Privy Council of the United Kingdom
Members of the Parliament of the United Kingdom for Okehampton
Peers of the United Kingdom created by Queen Victoria
People educated at Eton College